The 2005 Michigan Wolverines football team represented the University of Michigan in the 2005 NCAA Division I-A football season. The team's head coach was Lloyd Carr. The Wolverines played their home games at Michigan Stadium. That year Michigan Wolverines football competed in the Big Ten Conference in almost all intercollegiate sports including men's college football. Despite a disappointing 7–5 finish after being ranked as high as No. 3 early in the season, Michigan did not lose a game by more than a touchdown and upset Penn State, who finished #3 in the nation, on a last second touchdown pass from Chad Henne to Mario Manningham. The team earned an invitation to the 2005 Alamo Bowl, where it lost to the Nebraska Cornhuskers by a 32–28 margin. The team's first five conference games were all decided in the final 24 seconds of regulation or in overtime.

Schedule

Roster

Game summaries

Michigan State

Penn State

Source: ESPN

Iowa

Statistical achievements
The team led the conference in kick return average in all games (23.4), while Michigan State led in conference games.  Mike Hart set the school record for career 200-yard games (4), passing Ron Johnson's 3 set in 1968. He extended the record, which is still standing, to 5 in 2007.  His 200-yard game came after missing two and a half games due to injury. During the three injury-affected games Michigan lost to Notre Dame and Wisconsin and slipped out of the polls for the first time since 1998, snapping the nation's longest streak of 114-straight poll appearances.

Awards and honors
Co-captains: Jason Avant, Pat Massey
Academic All-American: Avant (second team)
All-Conference: Jason Avant, Matt Lentz, Adam Stenavich, Gabe Watson
Most Valuable Player: Jason Avant
Meyer Morton Award: Tim Massaquoi
John Maulbetsch Award: Chad Henne
Frederick Matthei Award: Leon Hall
Arthur Robinson Scholarship Award: Paul Sarantos, David Schoonover
Hugh Rader Jr. Award: Adam Stenavich
Robert P. Ufer Award: Tim Massaquoi
Roger Zatkoff Award: David Harris
Dick Katcher Award: Alan Branch

Coaching staff
Head coach: Lloyd Carr
Assistant coaches: Erik Campbell (assistant head coach), Mike DeBord,[Jim Herrmann] Ron English, Fred Jackson, Ron Lee, Scot Loeffler, Andy Moeller, Steve Stripling, Steve Szabo
Trainer: Paul Schmidt

References

External links
  2005 Football Team -- Bentley Historical Library, University of Michigan Athletics History
 2005 Michigan at NCAA.org
 2005 statistics at ESPN.com

Michigan
Michigan Wolverines football seasons
Michigan Wolverines football